The discography of the English rock band Paul McCartney and Wings, also known simply as Wings, consisted of seven studio albums, one live album, two compilation albums, 29 singles and 19 music videos. Founded in 1971 by former Beatle Paul McCartney, his wife Linda McCartney, Denny Laine and Denny Seiwell after the release of the McCartneys' album Ram, the band made their debut with Wild Life, released in December that year. The album garnered minimal commercial success and received generally poor reviews. In 1972, the band added Henry McCullough to the lineup and released several non-album singles, including "Give Ireland Back to the Irish", "Mary Had a Little Lamb", and "Hi, Hi, Hi", before releasing their second album, Red Rose Speedway, in 1973. While receiving mixed reviews, the album and its lead single, "My Love" were huge commercial successes, both reaching number one in the US charts. Wings' continued their commercial success with the title track to the James Bond film Live and Let Die. At the beginning of the recording sessions for their next album, McCullough and Seiwell left the band prompting the McCartneys and Laine to record their next album as a trio. Backed by the successful singles, "Jet" and the title track, the album, Band on the Run, became Wings' most successful album, reaching number one in both the US and the UK. The album also garnered highly positive reviews from critics and significantly restored McCartney's tarnished post-Beatles reputation.

Following Band on the Run, Scottish musician Jimmy McCulloch and English drummer Geoff Britton joined the band and recorded their next single, "Junior's Farm". During the sessions for their follow-up album, Britton left the band and was replaced by American musician Joe English. 
Backed by the number one single "Listen to What the Man Said", the album, Venus and Mars, wasn't as well-received as Band on the Run, but was nevertheless a commercial success, reaching number one. After Venus and Mars, the band embarked on a highly successful world tour in 1975. Their fifth album, Wings at the Speed of Sound, was recorded and released in between legs of the tour. The album saw the first time a Wings' album featured every member on lead vocals at least once. While the album received lukewarm reviews, it was a commercial success, supported by the number one singles, "Silly Love Songs" and "Let 'Em In". The live album Wings over America was released after the tour's end and was a huge commercial success, becoming the band's fifth number one album.

In late 1977, Wings' released "Mull of Kintyre" as a double A-side with "Girls' School". The single reached number one in the UK and remains one of the best selling UK singles of all time. After "Mull of Kintyre", the band released their next studio album, London Town, in 1978. Preceded by the successful hit, "With a Little Luck", the album was another commercial success for the group, and received positive reviews from critics. Despite strong album sales, the post-album singles, "I've Had Enough" and "London Town", were not as successful. After the album's release, McCulloch and English both left the group. The band followed London Town with the successful single "Goodnight Tonight" in 1979. The band's next album, Back to the Egg, saw the addition of Laurence Juber and Steve Holley to the lineup. Released in 1979, Back to the Egg was a major failure, received very negative reviews from critics and failed to produce any hits. After the band toured the UK, McCartney was arrested in Japan for possession of marijuana, cancelling a planned tour in 1980. After McCartney released his second solo album, McCartney II, Wings officially disbanded in 1981.

Albums

Studio albums

Live albums

Compilation albums

Singles

Other appearances

Videography

Video albums

Music videos

Documentaries

See also
 Paul McCartney discography

References

Bibliography
 
 
 
 
 
 
 
 
 
 

Wings Discography
Discography
Rock music group discographies
Discographies of British artists
Pop music group discographies